Dame Margery Freda Perham  (6 September 1895 – 19 February 1982) was a British historian of, and writer on, African affairs. She was known especially for the intellectual force of her arguments in favour of British decolonisation in the 1950s and 1960s.

Life and career

She was born in Bury, Lancashire, and educated at the School of S. Anne, Abbots Bromley and St Hugh's College, Oxford. After completing her Oxford degree, she became an assistant lecturer in history at the University of Sheffield in 1917. In 1922, as a result of illness, she took a year’s leave, which she spent in Somaliland with her sister’s family, beginning her lifelong interest in the British African colonies.

In 1924 she became a tutor and subsequently fellow in modern history and modern greats (philosophy, politics and economics) at St Hugh's College. In 1929 she was awarded a travelling fellowship administered by The Rhodes Trust, which oversees the Rhodes Scholarship (closed to women until 1977), and from July 1929 until early 1932 visited the United States, the Pacific islands, Australia, New Zealand, and much of Africa south of the Sahara. In 1932 she was awarded a Rockefeller Travelling Fellowship for travel and study in East Africa and the Sudan.

During the 1930s she wrote the first of many books on Africa, including Native Administration in Nigeria (1937) and African Discovery (1942; jointly with Jack Simmons), and from 1935 to 1939 was research lecturer in colonial administration at Oxford. In 1939 she was appointed the first official and only woman fellow of the newly founded Nuffield College, Oxford, and was also elected reader in colonial administration, a post she held until 1948. Her teaching at this time was almost entirely devoted to the first and second Devonshire courses for colonial servants, though later she played a part in the development of universities for the new African leaders and experts, and helped in the initiation of the Oxford Colonial Records Project. Her books, reports and papers provided the basis for the Oxford Institute of Colonial Studies, to which she was appointed director, 1945–1948.

Her 1941 book Africans and British Rule was banned in Kenya by the British Governor who argued that the book had "anti-settler bias" that would likely "stir up racial feelings." At the same time, the book was criticized by anti-colonial activists, such as C. L. R. James and George Padmore.

Her official biography of Lord Lugard appeared in two volumes in 1956 and 1960, and she published four volumes of Lugard’s diaries (1959–63).

In 1961 she became the first woman to deliver the Reith Lectures, her lectures being published as The Colonial Reckoning. Historian Kenneth O. Morgan called these lectures "a powerful intellectual force" and "widely influential," especially in shaping the Labour Party's views on decolonisation. Historian Caroline Elkins describes Perham as having "encyclopedic knowledge of the empire and its administration."

She was appointed CBE in 1948 and DCMG in 1965. She received honorary degrees from several universities, and was made an Honorary Fellow of St Hugh's College, Oxford, in 1962. She was the first President of the African Studies Association of the UK (ASAUK; 1963–64).

In 1968 she was criticised strongly when she espoused the cause of Biafra in the Nigerian Civil War. After a visit to Nigeria, she recanted her earlier views publicly on radio and television. She was elected a foreign honorary member of the American Academy of Arts and Sciences in 1969.

See also
 Institute of Commonwealth Studies

References

External links
Helen McCarthy's review of C. Brad Faught's Into Africa: The Imperial Life of Margery Perham
Margery Freda Perham (1895-1982), britac.ac.uk; accessed 6 November 2016.
Oxfordshire Blue Plaque to Dame Margery Perham erected at 5 Rawlinson Road, Oxford on  1 June 2019.

1895 births
1982 deaths
People educated at Abbots Bromley School for Girls
Alumni of St Hugh's College, Oxford
Fellows of Nuffield College, Oxford
Dames Commander of the Order of St Michael and St George
Commanders of the Order of the British Empire
Fellows of the American Academy of Arts and Sciences
Fellows of the British Academy
People from Bury, Greater Manchester
Presidents of the African Studies Association of the United Kingdom